Mainatari (Maihanatari) is an extinct Arawakan language of Venezuela that was spoken on the Castaña-Paraná, a tributary of the Siapa River in the Orinoco basin. It is closely related to Yabahana.

Vocabulary
Mainatari is poorly attested. Only 52 words were collected by Johann Natterer in 1831. Mainatari words from Ramirez (2019), cited from Natterer (1831), are given below:

{| class="wikitable sortable"
! Portuguese gloss (original) !! English gloss (translated) !! Mainatari
|-
| cabeça || head || -júhu-dau
|-
| cabelo || hair || -ʃehi
|-
| orelha || ear || -tehĩn
|-
| olho || eye || -awi
|-
| nariz || nose || -ti
|-
| boca || mouth || -numa
|-
| dente || tooth || -aida
|-
| pé || foot || -eti
|-
| coxa || thigh || -hohi
|-
| mão || hand || -kapi
|-
| barriga || belly || -paga
|-
| carne || meat || -ʃné
|-
| branco (pessoa) || white (person) || jalanai
|-
| irmão || brother || baaba, -iejú
|-
| irmã || sister || meme, -tegau
|-
| anta || tapir || ama-hingo
|-
| peixe || fish || maʃatʃi
|-
| sol || sun || kamóhu
|-
| lua || moon || kamu (?)
|-
| estrela || star || siwi
|-
| água || water || uni
|-
| casa || house || paigü
|-
| fogo || fire || ikatʃe
|-
| eu || me || no-
|-
| quê? || what? || maĩna
|-
| cão; animal de criação || dog; domesticated animal || biga-di
|-
| anta || tapir || amáhingo
|-
| queixada || Tayassu pecari || hapitʃa
|-
| veado || deer || anhinga
|-
| onça || jaguar || ʃawü
|-
| mutum || Cracidae || tumuku
|-
| urumutum || Nothocrax urumutum || ʃahimahin
|-
| cujubim || Pipile cujubi || koragü
|-
| urubu || vulture || wagu
|-
| arara || macaw || itihĩn
|-
| jabuti || Chelonoidis tortoise || ʃanaʃu
|-
| peixe || fish || maʃatʃi
|-
| jamaru (cabaça) || gourd || kakuhida
|-
| mandioca || manioc || kehi / keʃi
|-
| beiju || beiju || kai
|-
| milho || maize || tʃono
|-
| banana || banana || banala
|-
| arco || bow || kurapa
|-
| canoa || canoe || iʃaa
|-
| caxiri || cauim || ʃaraki
|-
| machado || axe || ʃipala
|-
| pote || bowl || orusu
|-
| rede || net || mengü
|-
| zarabatana || blowpipe || watahũn
|}

References

Arawakan languages
Languages of Venezuela